Arichuwa (Aymara or Quechua for a kind of potatoes, Hispanicized spelling Arichua) is a mountain in the Andes of southern Peru, about  high. It is situated in the Moquegua Region, Mariscal Nieto Province, Carumas District. Arichuwa lies north of the lake Aqhuyach'alla (Pasto Grande), southwest of the mountains Wilaquta,  Qurini and Qhini Jamach'ini, and west of Qina Mich'ini.

References

Mountains of Moquegua Region
Mountains of Peru